Ang is a Hokkien and Teochew romanization of the Chinese surnames Wang (Wāng) and Hong (Hóng).

Distribution
In mainland China and Taiwan, names are recorded in Chinese characters and officially romanized using Hanyu Pinyin.

However, Ang was the 12th-most-common surname among Chinese Singaporeans in the year 2000. In Southeast Asia, most of the Ang descendants have settled in Singapore and Penang of Malaysia. Their ancestors came from mainland China, mostly from Fujian, and some of their history could be traced up to four generations. A significant number of Ang descendants could be found in the Philippines. In the United States, it is much less common: the surname ranked 18,359th in 1990 and 11,317th in the year 2000.

A branch of The Tang royal family from the Tang dynasty/Empire in China 618–907 has emigrate to the Philippines prior to the beginning of the Sui dynasty/Empire and followed by the Five Dynasties and Ten Kingdoms period in Chinese history and has taken up the Ang surname. The Ang blood line from the Philippines is the only known royal Chinese blood line that emigrated to the Philippines in old records.

The Tang/Ang family and descendants in old China are known to poses the strongest chi in Chinese Kung-Fu and other ancient martial arts.

Notable people
 Betty Ang, Filipina businesswoman of Chinese descent
 Ang Lian Huat (1924-1984), Shaolin martial arts lineage holder and founder of the world's first Kung Fu association in 1954
 Ramon Ang, Filipino businessman
 Sunny Ang, Singaporean convicted murderer

See also

Ant (name)
 Wang and Hong, for other romanizations & history

References

Hokkien-language surnames